Kilroy was a BBC One daytime chat show hosted by Robert Kilroy-Silk that began on 24 November 1986 and finished on 29 January 2004 after 17 years. The series was originally called Day to Day for the first two series, and renamed to Kilroy in September 1987.

Controversy and cancellation 
The show was taken off the air in 2004 after Kilroy made allegedly racist remarks. Kilroy questioned what contribution Arabs have made to civilisation beyond oil. He stated other views that made matters worse. He ridiculed Scots, the Irish, the Iraqis, Black people, Pakistanis, the French and Germans. The Commission for Racial Equality reported him to the police.
 
The BBC cancelled the show, stating that his views were a threat to the network's impartiality. Kilroy claimed afterwards on the BBC's Question Time that he had been under a six-month investigation when this happened. He stated that his show was cancelled because he was anti-religion, rather than racist. However panelist Shappi Khorsandi claimed that his views were about Arabs as a people rather than their religion. Kilroy had previously claimed to have apologised in 2004. It was rejected primarily because Kilroy himself twisted his words. Iqbal Sacranie (secretary-general of the Muslim Council of Britain) claimed that Kilroy had not retracted his views but skimmed over the apology and changed a few words.

The programme was replaced by Now You're Talking!, which followed a similar format and was presented by Nicky Campbell and Nadia Sawalha. The show was also produced by Kilroy-Silk's production company.

References

External links 

1986 British television series debuts
2004 British television series endings
1980s British television talk shows
1990s British television talk shows
2000s British television talk shows
BBC television talk shows
English-language television shows
Television shows shot at BBC Elstree Centre